Fredericksburg Theater Company is a non-profit 501(c)(3) organization founded in 1997 by former city mayor Jeryl Hoover and based in Fredericksburg, Texas.  The company has been awarded the title of Best Theatre in the San Antonio Region on six occasions by the entertainment website Broadway World, most recently in 2023. In 2020 it was also voted Best Theater of the Decade for the San Antonio Region (2010-2020 by Broadway World. 

The company's mission states that it is to "provide superior theatrical programs for regional participation which entertain, educate, enrich and inspire." Company performances all take place in the Steve W Shepherd Theater which has a capacity of 250 seats.

References

External links
 Fredericksburg Theater Company

Theatres in Texas
501(c)(3) organizations
Fredericksburg, Texas